Ghost followers, also referred to as ghosts and ghost accounts or lurkers, are users on social media platforms who remain inactive or do not engage in activity. They register on platforms such as Twitter and Instagram. These users follow active members, but do not partake in liking, commenting, messaging, and posting. These accounts may be created by people or by social bots.

Ghost follower scams
Many ghost followers are accounts created by scammers who create fictional profiles and use them to target and scam others.

Buying followers 
Commercial services provide the ability to buy Instagram followers, most of which are ghosts. These individuals are paid to follow accounts but are not required to engage with them. This allows those seeking publicity to quickly increase their number of followers and appear to be popular, or "trending". For example, Rantic (formerly "SocialVEVO" and "Swenzy") was able to increase the number of Daily Dot's Twitter followers from 48,000 followers to 122,000 in only four days. This faux-popularity may still attract "volunteer" users. However, this technique may backfire if its use becomes known. According to Olivier Blanchard, unless the objective is just to appear popular, purchased ghosts do not help meet business objectives, other than possibly a form of brand marketing.

In January 2018 an article in the New York Times described the business of a company called Devumi in selling ghost followers on Twitter, and named many of Devumi's customers.

Rantic.com
Rantic is perhaps the most widely publicized seller of ghost followers. According to a New York Times report, Rantic's clientele includes corporations, celebrities, journalists, politicians and even governments. The company rose to international mainstream media attention over its "controversial" bots, which can reportedly generate millions of user accounts on social media platforms. 
These ghost followers are being purchased for many popular social platforms including Instagram, Facebook and Twitter, and SoundCloud.

As a result, the practice of selling ghost followers has turned into a multimillion-dollar online business, according to another New York Times report.

Devumi
Devumi sold more than 200 million fake followers. Even at its peak the company was tiny with their main office located above a restaurant in Florida. The firm primarily sold Twitter bots sourced from operations like Peakerr, SkillPatron, JAP, Cheap Panel and YTbot at a markup to celebrity and commercial clients. The company also operated on YouTube, SoundCloud, and LinkedIn.

See also
 Asymmetric follow
 Crowds on Demand
 Ghosting (behavior)
 Influence-for-hire
 Rental family service
 Social bot
 Social spam
 Sock puppet account

References

Confidence tricks
Internet manipulation and propaganda
Social media accounts